Peter Leonard Coe (18 April 1929 – 25 May 1987), was an English theatre director.

Early life
Coe was born in London 18 April 1929 and graduated from the London Academy of Music and Dramatic Art.

Theatre career
After beginning as an actor, Peter Coe staged dramas, musicals and operas across several continents in a long career. His first London success came in 1959 with the musical Lock Up Your Daughters and by 1961 he had three hits running simultaneously. He also directed both the Australian and Broadway productions of Oliver! as well as its U.S. national tour and the 1983 London and 1984 Broadway revivals.

His operatic credits included The Love of Three Oranges, The Angel of Fire, and Ernani.

In 1981 Coe received an Antoinette Perry Award nomination as Best Director for A Life, and in 1982 he won the award for his revival of Othello.

He was thrice nominated for the Tony award on Broadway; in 1963 for Best Director (musical) for Oliver!, 1981 for Best Director (play) for A Life before winning for Best Director (drama) with Othello in 1982.

His theatre productions included:
 Lock Up Your Daughters (Mermaid Theatre, London 1959) 
 The World of Suzie Wong (Prince of Wales Theatre, London 1959)
 The Miracle Worker (London 1961)
 The World of Suzie Wong (London 1961)
 Oliver! (New Theatre, London 1961)  
 Castle in Sweden (Piccadilly Theatre, London 1962)  
 Caligula (Phoenix Theatre, London 1964)
 Golden Boy (1964)
 Oliver! (Hanna Theatre, Cleveland, Ohio 1964)  
 On a Clear Day You Can See Forever (1966)
 The Italian Straw Hat (Chichester Festival Theatre 1967)
 The Skin of Our Teeth (Chichester Festival Theatre 1968)
 Oliver! (Piccadilly Theatre, London 1968 revival)
 The Caucasian Chalk Circle (Chichester Festival Theatre 1969)
 Kiss Me, Kate (London Coliseum, 1970)
 Peer Gynt (Chichester Festival Theatre 1970)
 Hamlet (Bankside Globe Playhouse, London 1972)
 Tonight We Improvise (Chichester Festival Theatre 1974)
 Mister Lincoln (1980)
 On the Twentieth Century (Her Majesty's Theatre, London 1980) 
 Barnum (London Palladium 1981)
 Henry V (Shakespeare Memorial Theatre, Stratford, Connecticut 1981)
 Hamlet (Shakespeare Memorial Theatre, Stratford, Connecticut 1982)
 Othello (Shakespeare Memorial Theatre, Stratford, Connecticut 1982 revival)
 Barnum (London Palladium 1983 revival)
 Oliver! (London 1983 revival)
 Hello, Dolly! (Birmingham Rep and Prince of Wales Theatre with Danny La Rue) 
 Barnum (Manchester Opera House 1984 revival with Wendy Toye)
 Great Expectations (The Old Vic, London 1984) 
 Oliver! (Broadway 1984 revival) 
 Jane Eyre (Chichester Festival Theatre 1986)

His appointments included artistic director of the Citadel Theatre, Edmonton, Canada in 1980 and  the American Shakespeare Theatre in Stratford, United States. Prior to his death, he was the artistic director of the Churchill Theatre, Bromley.

Filmography
 Lock Up Your Daughters (1969) 
 Barnum (1981)
 Mr Lincoln (1981)

References
 Film Reference
 Peter Coe and Tsai Chin in Colombo 1959
 New York Times obituary, 3 June 1987
 The Bromley Times obituary 1987 
 Variety obituary 27 May 1987

External links

1929 births
1987 deaths
Alumni of the London Academy of Music and Dramatic Art
English artistic directors
British opera directors
English male stage actors
English theatre directors
English film directors
Road incident deaths in London